P.D. Elangovan is an Indian politician. He was elected to the Lok Sabha the lower house of Indian Parliament from Dharmapuri in 1999 as a member of the  Pattali Makkal Katchi. He later joined the Bharatiya Janata Party.

References

External links
 Official biographical sketch in Parliament of India website

Pattali Makkal Katchi politicians
Living people
1953 births
India MPs 1999–2004
Bharatiya Janata Party politicians from Tamil Nadu
Lok Sabha members from Tamil Nadu
People from Cuddalore district
People from Dharmapuri district